Ipomoea aurantiaca is a species of morning glory found in Costa Rica, Mexico, Guatemala, and Nicaragua. It is a twining vine that has yellow flowers.

References 

aurantiaca
Flora of Costa Rica
Flora of Mexico
Flora of Guatemala
Flora of Nicaragua